The Chalbi Desert is a small desert in northern Kenya near the border with Ethiopia. It is east of Lake Turkana and contains North Horr. Marsabit is the closest major urban center.

Etymology 
In the language of the Gabbra people, Chalbi means "bare, salty area".

Location and description 

The Chalbi Desert is located in between Mount Marsabit and Lake Turkana. The area is 110 km long and 10 to 20 km wide and it extends over 1,000 km2.

The area is composed by both an ancient lakebed and rocky and lava regions. The ancient lakebed of Chalbi used to be a shallow lake around 10,000 to 11,000 years ago. The lava hills provide some altitudinal change in an otherwise plain region. The ground is a combination of dried mud and salt. When it rains, the ground becomes a soft, sticky surface.

Chalbi desert has been recognized as an important geosite of Kenya. The preserved fossils of the area have been critical to the understanding of the Quaternary climate in East Africa. These fossils include aquatic animals like the Nile perch. It is also a site of the mineral eugsterite.

Climate 
Chalbi is a rain-shadow desert. Mean annual rainfall is approximately 150 mm (or up to 350 mm) and falls during two rainy seasons but rainfall is erratic and some years the area barely receives any rainfall at all. In 1973, for example, only 7 mm of rainfall were recorded. Meanwhile, the potential evaporation likely is over 2,600 mm. At the edge of the desert, there are numerous springs, which create oases of water and grasses.

Occasionally, rain falls as a heavy downpour, and the water runs off through the hard desert surface and pools at surface depressions. In years of exceptional rainfall, a temporary lake is formed that can last several months. This happened during 1978, for example, when a temporary lake of 50 cm in depth was formed for long enough for waterfowl to make use of it.

The Chalbi desert sustains high winds. In fact, the area has some of the strongest and most sustained wind systems of the world. The area sustains for over 50 days per years wind speeds of over 50 kilometres per hour. Sandstorms are a feature of the region.

Fauna 
The following herbivores can be found in the region: oryx, African elephant, Somali ostrich, Grevy's zebra, and reticulated giraffe. In the past, black rhinoceros used to live in the area, but they were hunted to extinction. As for the large predator guild, African lions live in the region.

Flora 
The high salinity makes the area home to only a few plant species. Most of the Chalbi Desert is barren and has no vegetation. One of those areas where plants do grow is usually near outlets of tributary streams after the seasonal rainfalls. Salvadora persica, Acacia tortilis, and Cordia sinensis can grow in the areas around Chalbi's drainage system, but most plants that grow in the desert are annual plants. One of those plants is Drakebrockmania somalensis. During years of high rainfall, these areas can be seen covered by grasses like Aristida adscensionis and A. mutabilis. Another region where some plants grow is in the former lake bed. There, one can find Lagenantha nogalensis. Finally, one can also find plants on the edges of the desert, such as Dasysphaera prostrata or Hyphaene coriacea.

Human habitation 
The Gabbra pastoralists live around this area of Kenya. These nomadic people herd goats and cattle, and camels to some extent. A few other pastoralists are also present in the region, such as the Rendille, the Dasanech, or the Turkana.

Technology 
The largest wind farm in Africa is located in the west edge of the desert. Unfortunately, no benefits from the wind farm have reached the local communities.

References

Deserts of Kenya
Endorheic basins of Africa
Masai xeric grasslands and shrublands